Maurice Hicks (born July 22, 1978) is a former American football running back. He was originally signed by the Chicago Bears as an undrafted free agent in 2002. He played college football at North Carolina A&T.

Hicks has also played for the San Francisco 49ers, Scottish Claymores and Minnesota Vikings.

Early years
While attending Greensville County High School in Emporia, Virginia Hicks was a standout in football as a tailback and safety.

College career
While attending North Carolina Agricultural and Technical State University, Hicks finished his career with a school-record 2,812 rushing yards. As a senior, he was a third-team Division I-AA All-American selection, the Black College Offensive Player of the Year, a first-team All-MEAC selection, and he led the MEAC in rushing yards with 1,325 rushing yards. During his senior season, in a game against Morgan State University, he broke the NCAA Division I and II single game rushing records by rushing for 437 rushing yards. As a junior, he was a first-team All-MEAC selection, after rushing for 1,487 yards.

Professional career

Chicago Bears
He was signed as an undrafted free agent by the Chicago Bears in the 2002 NFL Draft.

San Francisco 49ers
Hicks was signed as a free agent by the San Francisco 49ers in 2003. While with the 49ers he was the second string running back behind Kevan Barlow.

Minnesota Vikings
On March 4, 2008, he signed a three-year deal with the Minnesota Vikings.

Hicks was released by the Vikings, on February 18, 2009.

External links
Just Sports Stats
Official Website
Minnesota Vikings bio
San Francisco 49ers bio

1978 births
Living people
People from Emporia, Virginia
American football running backs
American football return specialists
North Carolina A&T Aggies football players
Chicago Bears players
San Francisco 49ers players
Scottish Claymores players
Minnesota Vikings players
Florida Tuskers players